The Scoop Package Manager is a command-line installer for Windows.
Like other package managers, when commanded to install one program,
it downloads and installs that program and also any dependencies of that program.

The system package manager Scoop is often used for installing web development
tools and other software development tools.

Like other package managers,
Scoop makes it easy to discover out-of-date packages and update them.

Scoop installs apps in the current user's home directory,
so it does not require admin permissions to install or update software.

This allows Scoop to install software without UAC popups.
This is similar to
a few other package managers
that support installing apps in the current user's home directory
(such as
Listaller,
AppImage, and
ClickOnce).
Most other package managers
(such as Chocolatey)
install applications in one central location,
where they are usable by all the users on the system.

Many Windows developers recommend
that Windows developers
install both Chocolatey and Scoop.
Both have strong community support.

Scoop lets developers quickly set up a repeatable development environment.

References 

Command-line software
Free package management systems